Manel Exposito Presseguer (born 29 November 1981 in Barcelona) is a Spanish retired footballer who now works as assistant coach at K.A.S. Eupen and Aspire Academy in Belgium and Qatar.

Career

Exposito started his senior career with UE Vic. In 2013, he signed for K.A.S. Eupen in the Belgian First Division B, where he made twenty-four appearances and scored two goals before retiring in 2015.

References 

Living people
1981 births
Spanish footballers
Association football forwards
Spanish expatriate footballers
Expatriate footballers in Belgium
Expatriate association footballers in New Zealand
Auckland City FC players
K.A.S. Eupen players
CE Júpiter players
UE Sant Andreu footballers
FC Barcelona players
Atlético Madrid C players
AD Alcorcón footballers
Benidorm CF footballers
UDA Gramenet footballers
CF Atlético Ciudad players
AD Cerro de Reyes players
FC Barcelona Atlètic players